Mynhardt is a surname. Notable people with this name include:

Amanda Mynhardt (born 1986), South African netball player
Chané Mynhardt, South African competitor on Survivor South Africa: Philippines
Joe Mynhardt, writer, nominee for 2014 Bram Stoker Award for Best Non-Fiction
Kieka Mynhardt, South African and Canadian mathematician
Nikolai Mynhardt, South African actor in The Perfect Wave
Patrick Mynhardt (1932–2007), South African actor
Siegfried Mynhardt (1906–1996), South African actor

See also
Mynhardt Kawanivi (born 1984), Namibian long-distance runner